This is a list of Cambridge United managers since the 1970/71 season and the club's inception into the Football League. The club had 15 permanent managers as a League club until it was relegated to the Football Conference in 2005, as well as three who took the role on a caretaker basis. Only John Beck has held the role more than once, including a spell from 1990 to 1992 which is generally considered one of the most successful in the club's history.
The current manager of Cambridge United is Mark Bonner

Managers since 1970
This list includes all those who have managed the club since 1970, when the club joined the Football League for the first time, whether managing on a full-time or caretaker basis. Games played include all league and cup matches (if applicable), and the win percentage is calculated from the total of games.

Earlier Managers
The above table lists managers since Cambridge United's election to the Football League, however the club existed for some 58 years before 1970. Some of the managers that took charge of Cambridge in this earlier period between the end of the Second World War and 1970 include:
Roy Kirk (1964–1966)
Alan Moore (1960–1963)
Bill Craig (1959–1960)
Bert Johnson (1955–1959)
Gerald Williams (1955)
Bill Whittaker (1949–1955)

Assistant Managers
Many people have taken the role of assistant manager at Cambridge United in its long history. These include, in recent times: John Cozens, Malcolm Webster, John Beck, Gary Johnson, Brian Owen, Tommy Taylor, Paul Clark, Danny O'Shea, David Preece, Shane Westley, Rob Newman, Tony Spearing, Steve Castle, Alan Lewer, Willy Wordsworth Paul Carden and Nolan Keeley.

See also
History of Cambridge United F.C.

References

Managers
 
Cambridge United F.C.
Managers